Virginia Margaret Bell  (born 7 March 1951) is a former Justice of the High Court of Australia, the highest court in the Australian court hierarchy. She was sworn in on 3 February 2009, and retired on 28 February 2021.

Early life and education
Bell was educated at SCEGGS Darlinghurst before attending the University of Sydney, where she graduated in law in 1976.

Career
Bell was admitted as a solicitor of New South Wales in 1977 and worked as a solicitor at the Redfern Legal Centre in Sydney from 1978 to 1984. Between 1982 and 1984, she was a member of the Board of Governors of the Law Foundation. In 1984, Bell was called to the NSW bar, joining Frederick Jordan Chambers. Bell was appointed a public defender in 1986, returning to private practice in late 1989. She was one of the counsel assisting the Wood Royal Commission into the New South Wales Police Service between 1994 and 1997. In November 1997, she was appointed Senior Counsel.

Bell was sworn in as a judge of the Supreme Court of New South Wales on 25 March 1999. She was appointed to the Court of Appeal of that court in early 2008, resigning on 19 December 2008 in order to be appointed to the High Court. During her time on the Supreme Court, she presided over a defamation case brought by Rene Rivkin, holding that allegations of homosexuality were no longer defamatory at common law.

Bell was President of the Australasian Institute of Judicial Administration from 2007 to 2008. She was Chair of the University of Wollongong Law Faculty Advisory Committee from 2007 to 2008. From 1998 to 1999, she served as a part-time Commissioner of the Law Reform Commission of New South Wales. She is a former host of the ABC Radio National program Late Night Live.

High Court
In December 2008, Attorney-General Robert McClelland announced that Bell would succeed Michael Kirby on the High Court. She was sworn in on 3 February 2009. According to Kate Hannon in The Sydney Morning Herald, her appointment was "welcomed as redressing a lack of criminal law expertise on the bench of Australia's superior court, and as going some way towards correcting the gender imbalance". Commentator Natasha Stojanovich noted the "disproportionate media focus on Justice Bell's gender and commitment to social justice".

According to Jeremy Gans, a Melbourne Law School professor, Bell's partnership with Susan Kiefel and Patrick Keane is "the most powerful bloc of judges in the court's history". Gans found that, as of 2018, the three justices had been in agreement in 88 percent of the 116 cases where they had sat together.

Inquiry into joint ministerial positions 

On 26 August 2022, Prime Minister Anthony Albanese and Attorney-General Mark Dreyfus announced that the government had appointed Bell "to lead an inquiry into the appointment of former Prime Minister, the Hon Scott Morrison MP, to administer departments other than the Department of Prime Minister and Cabinet and related matters". The report was published on 25 November.

Honours
On 26 January 2012, Bell was appointed a Companion of the Order of Australia for "eminent service to the judiciary and to the law through leadership in criminal law reform and public policy development, to judicial administration, and as an advocate for the economically and socially disadvantaged".

Personal life
Bell lives in inner Sydney with her partner, a barrister. She has long been involved in the LGBT and human rights issues, participating in the first Mardi Gras LGBT rights rally in Sydney in 1978, which was broken up by police. She is the first lesbian to serve on the High Court, and the second openly LGBT person after Michael Kirby, whom she replaced upon his retirement on 3 February 2009.

On her appointment, Australian Law Reform Commission president David Weisbrot opined that Bell will be a "progressive" jurist in the tradition of Michael Kirby.

References

External links
 High Court of Australia profile

1951 births
Australian Senior Counsel
Companions of the Order of Australia
Justices of the High Court of Australia
Australian women judges
Judges of the Supreme Court of New South Wales
Living people
Sydney Law School alumni
LGBT judges
Australian lesbians
Public defenders
People educated at Sydney Church of England Girls Grammar School